"Station to Station" is a song by English musician David Bowie. It was released in January 1976 as the title track and opener of his tenth studio album Station to Station, as well as on a promotional 7-inch single in France the same month. Co-produced by Bowie and Harry Maslin, it was written and recorded at Cherokee Studios in Los Angeles between September and November 1975. At over 10 minutes in length, it is Bowie's longest studio recording. Opening with a train-like noise, the song's first half is a slow march, built around an atonal guitar riff, while the second half takes the form of a prog-disco suite in a different key and tempo than the first. It has been characterised as art rock and is influenced by the German electronic bands Kraftwerk and Tangerine Dream.

Lyrically, the song introduces Bowie's sinister persona the Thin White Duke, who became the mouthpiece for Station to Station and, throughout 1976, often the embodiment of Bowie himself. During the recording, Bowie was heavily dependent on drugs such as cocaine, which is referenced directly throughout. "Station to Station" also makes references to the Kabbalah, occultism, gnosticism, paranoia and other fixations that affected Bowie's mind at the time. The opening sound effect is a red herring meant to represent the Stations of the Cross, along with a juncture connecting two different stages of his career; it combined the funk and soul of his previous album Young Americans with the experimental sound he would explore on his "Berlin Trilogy".

"Station to Station" has received acclaim from music critics and biographers, who have praised the performance of the band and Bowie himself. Retrospectively, it has been named one of Bowie's greatest songs and, like its parent album, is seen as the indicator of where his career was heading at the time. He performed the track throughout the 1976 Isolar Tour, often in character as the Thin White Duke, and continued to perform it on different tours throughout his career. It was remastered, along with its parent album, as part of the box set Who Can I Be Now? (1974–1976) in 2016.

Composition

"Station to Station" was recorded at Cherokee Studios in Los Angeles between September and November 1975. According to Emily Barker of NME, Bowie "starved his body of all nutrients (besides milk, red peppers, and cocaine)" during the song's recording. Bowie would recall later that he could not remember recording the album at all, saying "I have only flashes of making it." Author David Buckley states that Bowie's only memory of the sessions was "standing with [lead guitarist] Earl Slick in the studio and asking him to play a Chuck Berry riff in the same key throughout the opening of 'Station to Station'."

At over 10 minutes in length, "Station to Station" is Bowie's longest studio recording. Structurally, the song builds from a droning, guitar-driven introductory portion that mimics a train building up speed. Following the train noise, the band begins to enter, with percussion and keyboards playing chords in and out of key. The march lasts for more than three minutes before Bowie begins his vocals. After several verses, at the five-minute mark, a thud of drums signals a change of tempo and key and the band erupts into what Alan Light of Rolling Stone calls a "celebratory groove", which lasts for the rest of the track. Doggett likens the section to a progressive rock suite by the 1970s bands Genesis and Jethro Tull. Like the album, the entire song encompasses art rock.

The train sound effect was created by Slick using flangers and delay effects. The noise pans from right to left across the stereo channels before fading out using feedback, which Doggett likens to "disappearing into a tunnel". According to Nicholas Pegg, the effect "acknowledges" the influence of the 1974 album Autobahn by the German electronic band Kraftwerk, which begins with a car starting up and driving across the stereo speakers. Pegg believes another influence is from Edgar Froese of the German electronic band Tangerine Dream, whom Bowie befriended during his "Berlin" years (1977–1979); Froese's 1975 album Epsilon in Malaysian Pale also begins with a train sound effect. However, he notes that the train is a red herring in that it expresses what Bowie later called "the album's 'wayward spiritual search'". More specifically, it reinstates the "travelling metaphor" of earlier compositions: "the stations recall the 'new surroundings' of "Rock 'n' Roll with Me" [from Diamond Dogs], and the "mountains on mountains" reprise the questing motifs of "Wild Eyed Boy from Freecloud" [from David Bowie (1969)] and The Man Who Sold the World." Bowie would later state, "the 'Station to Station' track itself is very much concerned with the Stations of the Cross", the series of 14 images depicting Christ's path to his crucifixion, each symbolising a stopping-point for prayer. Stuart Berman of Pitchfork supports this, saying: "the title track's momentous prog-disco suite [...] charts a course from spiritual void toward ecstatic religious reawakening." It has been also described as "Kraut-disco" by Rolling Stone.

Another possible influence is guitarist Jimmy Page of the English rock band Led Zeppelin. Page was a session musician on Bowie's earliest recordings and had been an occasional acquaintance ever since. During the same time Bowie became dependent on cocaine, Page had become dependent on heroin, which Pegg considered "even more fearful" than Bowie's addiction. Led Zeppelin's Physical Graffiti was released in February 1975, months ahead of the Station to Station sessions. Pegg writes: "It's possible to discern in ["Station to Station"] a distinct flavour of the groove, tempo and sense of building tension created by the famous rising riff of Physical Graffiti's standout track 'Kashmir'", an epic track that evokes a "troubled spiritual journey" through its music and lyrics.

Lyrics

"Station to Station" introduces Bowie's persona the Thin White Duke, a sinister figure who became the mouthpiece for Station to Station and, often throughout 1976, for Bowie himself. The persona was noticeably darker than Bowie's previous characters, being described as "a mad aristocrat", an "amoral zombie", and "an emotionless Aryan superman". For Bowie himself, the Duke was "a nasty character indeed". The lyrics themselves contain very cryptic messages and direct references, including to the 13th century Jewish mystical system known as the Kabbalah and gnosticism. Bowie would later claim in 1997: "All the references within ["Station to Station"] have to do with the Kabbalah." Doggett believes the main themes of the track are magic, the arts of legendary musicians, both real and fictitious, the Kabbalah's mythical account of progress from Kether to Malkuth, love and cocaine. Doggett further argues: "just as [the Hunky Dory track] "Quicksand" offered a catalogue of avenues open to the inquisitive imagination of David Bowie circa 1971, so "Station to Station" present a more confused medley of the themes that were haunting his nightmares in the final weeks of 1975."

The Duke introduces himself by saying "the return of the Thin White Duke/throwing darts in lovers' eyes." Darts, or arrows, are interpreted to be a symbol of direction revealing the dynamic of the True Will. Doggett argues that aside from the Thin White Duke, another duke was at the heart of the action: Prospero, the Duke of Milan and protagonist of William Shakespeare's play The Tempest. He writes that Prospero, like the Thin White Duke, is a "master of magic", who can control elements while "lost in my [magic] circle", as well as cast spells over "lovers' eyes" (mirroring throwing darts), as Prospero does with his daughter Miranda and her lover Ferdinand over the course of the play. Fixation with the English occultist Aleister Crowley is evident in such phrases as "white stains", the name of a book of poetry by Crowley, who was previously mentioned by Bowie on "Quicksand". Once the song changes into the prog-disco section, the lyrics become brighter. Punctuated by the refrain "It's too late", Bowie enters a landscape of "mountains and sunbirds". Themes in this section include drug use, as presented in the lyrics "It's not the side effects of the cocaine/I'm thinking that it must be love", which he sings in a joyous tone. Light writes that other themes present on the track are "paranoia and odd fixations" that were present in Bowie's mind at the time. At different points Bowie declares "the European canon is here", which Doggett believes is a "pretentious way" of summarising Bowie's interest in Kraftwerk and Brechtian theatre; he also notes the word 'canon' could be interpreted "at a stretch" as the word 'cannon'.

Release and reception
"Station to Station" was released as the opening title track to Bowie's tenth studio album of the same name on 23 January 1976. The song was also released as a promotional single, with the catalogue number 42549 A, in January 1976 in France by RCA Records, with a shortened duration of 3:40 and "TVC 15" as the B-side. The single version begins at the central section of the song with the drums just prior to the "once there were mountains..." lyric. The single edit appears on the 2010 Deluxe Edition of Station to Station and on Re:Call 2, as part of the 2016 box set Who Can I Be Now? (1974–1976). The full track was remastered, along with its parent album, and released on the same box set.

The song has been acclaimed by music critics, who have praised the performance of the band and Bowie himself. Nicholas Pegg described it as "Scintillatingly performed and gorgeously produced, it represents one of the high watermarks in his studio work." He further praises Bowie's vocal performance and Earl Slick's guitar contributions. Dave Thompson of AllMusic calls the guitar work "fabulous" and makes the argument that the track could be the most "evocative" song Bowie ever wrote. Doggett writes that what saves the track from "utter obscurity" and his audience from "alienation" was the music itself. Alex Needham of The Guardian, in a review declaring Station to Station his favorite album, calls the track "monumental", adding that "Bowie blasts away his immediate Philly soul past and speeds into a more experimental future over 10 totally exhilarating minutes". Needham also found it impressive that the song did not "overshadow" the rest of the album, which he believes shows "how much Bowie was on fire". In a review of the live album Glastonbury 2000 in 2018, Sean T. Collins of Pitchfork calls the track a "teutonic-occult behemoth" and a highlight of the album. He felt the main section's "off-kilter groove" and the "barreling braukeller climax" were made for performing live. He continued, "hearing Bowie croon Kabbalistic jargon like 'one magical movement from Kether to Malkuth' to [a] massive crowd serves as a helpful reminder that he remained, even then, one of the weirdest people ever to achieve festival-headlining success". In 2018, the writers of NME listed "Station to Station" as Bowie's 24th greatest song. In a list of Bowie's 50 greatest songs, Alexis Petridis of The Guardian ranked the song third, calling the shift into its second section as "possibly the single most thrilling moment in his entire catalogue." In 2021, Rolling Stone ranked it number 400 in their updated list of the 500 Greatest Songs of All Time.

Legacy
Buckley describes "Station to Station" as heralding "a new era of experimentalism" for Bowie. Along with the rest of the album, the song presented the new direction Bowie was taking in his career, from the funk and soul of Young Americans to the experimental sound of his "Berlin Trilogy". In 2001, Bowie said, "As far as the music goes, Low and its siblings were a direct follow-on from the title track [of Station to Station]. It's often struck me that there will usually be one track on any given album of mine, which will be a fair indicator of the intent of the following album." 
Needham from The Guardian similarly writes that with the lyrics "the European cannon is here", Bowie fully announces what was to come. Doggett writes: "Here was Bowie's first nod of recognition to the so-called motorik sound of Krautrock, as the ominous, Wagnerian strains of the early segments of the song were succeeded by the propulsive dance rhythms of the finale. Only a churl would have worried that the theme of this cathartic moment was that it was too – suggesting that the spiritual journey might be only just beginning."

Live versions
"Station to Station" was the opening number throughout the 1976 Isolar Tour. A performance from this tour was included on the live album Live Nassau Coliseum '76, which was released as part of the 2010 Deluxe Edition of Station to Station, in the 2016 box set Who Can I Be Now? (1974–1976), and as a standalone album in 2017. The song was subsequently performed on the Stage (1978), Serious Moonlight (1984), Sound+Vision (1990), Summer 2000, and A Reality (2003–2004) tours. Performances from the Stage Tour have been released on Stage (1978) and Welcome to the Blackout (2018). The Stage version was also featured in the Uli Edel film Christiane F. (1981), where Bowie, lip-synching to his 1978 recording, made an appearance as himself performing the song at a concert. An edit of this version was released on the film's soundtrack. A performance from the Serious Moonlight Tour was included on the live album Serious Moonlight (Live '83), which was part of the 2018 box set Loving the Alien (1983–1988) and released as a standalone album in 2019. Bowie's performance of the song at the Glastonbury Festival in June 2000 was released in 2018 on Glastonbury 2000.

Track listing
All songs written by David Bowie.
7" French promotional single
 "Station to Station" – 3:40
 "TVC 15" – 4:40

Personnel
Personnel per Rolling Stone and David Buckley.
David Bowie – lead vocals, acoustic guitar, production
Earl Slick – lead guitar
Carlos Alomar – rhythm guitar
George Murray – bass
Roy Bittan – piano, organ
Dennis Davis – drums
Warren Peace – percussion, backing vocals
Harry Maslin – melodica, production

References

Sources

British disco songs
British progressive rock songs
David Bowie songs
1976 songs
Songs written by David Bowie
Song recordings produced by David Bowie